Loharu Assembly constituency is one of the 90 Vidhan Sabha constituencies in Haryana state in northern India.

Overview
Loharu (constituency number 54) is one of the 6 Assembly constituencies located in Bhiwani district. This constituency covers the entire Loharu and Siwani tehsils.

Loharu is part of Bhiwani-Mahendragarh Lok Sabha constituency along with eight other Assembly segments, namely, Dadri, Badhra, Tosham and Bhiwani in this district and Ateli, Mahendragarh, Narnaul and Nangal Chaudhry in Mahendragarh district.

Members of Legislative Assembly
1967: Hiranand Arya, Indian National Congress
1972: Chandrawati, Indian National Congress 
1977: Hiranand Arya, Janata Party
1982: Hiranand Arya, Lok Dal
1987: Hiranand Arya, Lok Dal
1991: Chandrawati, Janata Dal 
1996: Somvir Singh, Haryana Vikas Party
2000: Bahadur Singh, Indian National Lok Dal
2005: Somvir Singh, Indian National Congress
2009: Dharam Pal, Indian National Lok Dal
2014: Om Parkash Barwa, Indian National Lok Dal
2019: Jai Parkash Dalal, Bharatiya Janata party

See also
 Loharu
 Siwani

References

Assembly constituencies of Haryana
Bhiwani district